The Naval Aircraft Factory N3N was an American tandem-seat, open cockpit, primary training biplane aircraft built by the Naval Aircraft Factory (NAF) in Philadelphia, Pennsylvania, during the 1930s and early 1940s.

Development and design
Built to replace the Consolidated NY-2 and NY-3, the N3N was successfully tested as both a conventional airplane and a seaplane. The seaplane used a single float under the fuselage and floats under the outer tips of the lower wing. The conventional airplane used a fixed landing gear. The prototype XN3N-1 was powered by a Wright J-5 radial engine. An order for 179 production aircraft was received. Near the end of the first production run the engine was replaced with the Wright R-760-2 Whirlwind radial. The aircraft is constructed using Alcoa's extruded aluminum, with bolts and rivets, rather than the more common welded steel tubing fuselages. Early production models used aluminum stringers formed for cancelled airship construction orders.

Operational history

The N.A.F. built 997 N3N aircraft beginning in 1935. They included 179 N3N-1s and 816 N3N-3s, plus their prototypes. Production ended in 1942, but the type remained in use through the rest of World War II. The N3N was the last biplane in US military service - the last (used by the U.S. Naval Academy for aviation familiarization) were retired in 1959. The N3N was also unique in that it was an aircraft designed and manufactured by an aviation firm wholly owned and operated by the U.S. government (the Navy, in this case) as opposed to private industry. For this purpose, the U.S. Navy bought the rights and the tooling for the Wright R-760 series engine and produced their own engines. These Navy-built engines were installed on Navy-built airframes.

According to Trimble, "The N3N-3, sometimes known as the Yellow Bird for its distinctive, high-visibility paint scheme, or less kindly, Yellow Peril for the jeopardy in which student aviators often found themselves, showed itself to be rugged, reliable, and generally forgiving to student pilots."

Four N3N-3s were delivered to the United States Coast Guard in 1941.  Postwar, many surviving aircraft were sold on the US civil aircraft market and bought for operation by agricultural aerial spraying firms and private pilot owners. A number are still (as of 2014) active in the USA.

Variants

XN3N-1
First prototype aircraft, Bureau of Aeronautics number 9991.
N3N-1 
Two-seat primary trainer biplane, powered by a  Wright R-790 Whirlwind (J-5) radial piston engine. 179 were built.
XN3N-2
One prototype only (Bureau number 0265) powered by a  Wright R-760-96 Whirlwind (J-6-7) radial piston engine. 
XN3N-3
One production N3N-1 (0020) converted into a 'dash three' prototype.
N3N-3
Two-seat primary trainer biplane, powered by a  Wright R-760-2 Whirlwind (J-6-7) radial piston engine. 816 built.

Operators
 

United States Coast Guard
U.S. Marines
United States Navy
Chilean Naval Airforce 4 N3N-1 received by Lend-Lease Program
Cuban Naval Airforce 5 N3N-1s received by Lend-Lease Program.

Surviving aircraft

 0719 – On display at the Museo Nacional Aeronáutico y del Espacio in Santiago.
 1918 – On display at the Warhawk Air Museum in Nampa, Idaho.
 2582 – On display at the Western Antique Aeroplane & Automobile Museum in Hood River, Oregon.
 2621 – On display at the Yanks Air Museum in Chino, California.
 2693 – On display at the National Museum of Naval Aviation in Pensacola, Florida.
 2733 – Airworthy with the High Sierra Squadron of the Commemorative Air Force in Reno, Nevada.
 2782 – On display at the Mid-Atlantic Air Museum in Reading, Pennsylvania.
 2827 – On display at the Yanks Air Museum in Chino, California.
 2831 – On display at the Evergreen Aviation and Space Museum in McMinnville, Oregon.
 2892 – On display at the Military Aviation Museum in Virginia Beach, Virginia.
 2951 – On display at the Kalamazoo Aviation History Museum in Kalamazoo, Michigan.
 2959 – On display at the USS Lexington Museum in Corpus Christi, Texas.
 3022 – On display at the National Air and Space Museum's Udvar Hazy Center in Chantilly, Virginia.
 3046 – On display at the National Museum of Naval Aviation in Pensacola, Florida.
 4402 - Airworthy with Joe McBryan (Buffalo Airways) in Yellowknife, Northwest Territories.
 4406 – Airworthy with Bernie Air Services in Sandown, Isle of Wight.
 4480 – On display at the Yanks Air Museum in Chino, California.
 4497 – On display at the Pima Air & Space Museum in Tucson, Arizona.

Specifications (N3N-3)

Communications were done by the instructor through a speaking tube to the student in the front cockpit. Communications back were agreed-upon gestures.

See also

References

Citations

Bibliography

External links

 "NAVAL AIRCRAFT FACTORY N3N YELLOW PERIL", by Jack McKillop, provides a detailed description of the N3N and its development.

N3N
1930s United States military trainer aircraft
Single-engined tractor aircraft
Biplanes
Carrier-based aircraft
Aircraft first flown in 1935